"Le cose che vivi" (English: The things that you live through) is a song recorded by Italian singer Laura Pausini for her third Italian-language studio album, Le cose che vivi. The song was released as the album's second single in January 1997. Pausini also recorded a Spanish-language version of the song, titled "Las cosas que vives" and a Portuguese-language version, with the title "Tudo o que eu vivo".
The song was also included on Pausini's compilation album The Best of Laura Pausini: E ritorno da te, released in 2001.

In 2013, the song is re-recorded for Pausini's compilation album 20 - The Greatest Hits / 20 - Grandes Éxitos with Brazilian singer Ivete Sangalo, in both Italian-Portuguese and Spanish-Portuguese versions.

Music video
The music video of this song is simple, with shots remembering a movie. During the clip, we see parts of Laura's day. The Spanish-language version of the clip was nominated for Video of the Year at the 9th Lo Nuestro Awards, losing to fellow Italian performer Eros Ramazzotti with "La Aurora".

Track listing
CD single – Italy
 "Le cose che vivi" – 4:31
 "Inolvidable" – 3:48

CD single – Mexico – Remix versions
 "Las cosas que vives" (Tullio Radio Edit) – 3:53
 "Las cosas que vives" (Dance Mix) – 3:20
 "Las cosas que vives" (Original Radio Mix One) – 4:00
 "Las cosas que vives" (Original Radio Mix Two) – 4:01
 "Las cosas que vives" (Original Mix) – 5:50
 "Las cosas que vives" (Fabio B Mix) – 4:26

Charts

Weekly charts

Italian version

Spanish version

Year-end charts

Spanish version

See also
List of Billboard Latin Pop Airplay number ones of 1996
List of Billboard Latin Pop Airplay number ones of 1997

References

Laura Pausini songs
Pop ballads
1997 singles
Italian-language songs
Spanish-language songs
Portuguese-language songs
Songs written by Cheope